Mohammad Husni Thamrin was an Indonesian national hero.

Thamrin may also refer to:

 Jalan MH Thamrin (Jakarta), a thoroughfare in Jakarta, Indonesia
 Thamrin City, a mall in Jakarta, Indonesia
 Thamrin Graha Metropolitan Medan, a football club based in North Sumatra, Indonesia
 Thamrin MRT Station, a MRT Station in Jakarta, Indonesia